The New Effington Hospital, on Oddin Ave. in New Effington, South Dakota, was listed on the National Register of Historic Places in 1989.  It had been repurposed by then to become the Effington Community Museum.

Built from 1913 to 1915, it is a two-story brick building on a concrete foundation. Its design reflecting elements of Commercial and Prairie School styles.

References

National Register of Historic Places in Roberts County, South Dakota
Late 19th and Early 20th Century American Movements architecture
Buildings and structures completed in 1915
Hospital buildings on the National Register of Historic Places in South Dakota